The 1981 Virginia lieutenant gubernatorial election was held on November 3, 1981. Democratic nominee Dick Davis defeated Republican nominee Nathan H. Miller with 55.44% of the vote.

General election

Candidates
Dick Davis, Democratic, Former Party Chair
Nathan H. Miller, Republican, State Senator

Results

References

Virginia
1981
Gubernatorial